Vincentia High School is a government-funded co-educational comprehensive secondary day school, located in the town of  in the South Coast region of New South Wales, Australia. The school is located adjacent to Jervis Bay. 

Established in 1993, the school enrolled approximately 1,000 students in 2018, from Year 7 to Year 12, of whom 16 percent identified as Indigenous Australians and five percent were from a language background other than English. The school is operated by the NSW Department of Education.

Overview 
The school serves a number of communities in the Jervis Bay, St Georges Basin, Tomerong and Sussex Inlet areas. Relative to other government-funded public high schools, Vincentia High School has a large Indigenous student population. The school receives Priority Schools Funding Program funding and runs many programs, including specialised tutoring aimed at improving literacy and numeracy skills, Aboriginal languages, dance and didgeridoo groups and alternate education programs for students in years 9 and 10. Year 11 and 12 students can access the after-hours coaching program. Vincentia High School has a large support unit with 15 classes.

See also 

 List of government schools in New South Wales
 List of schools in Illawarra and the South East (New South Wales)
 Education in Australia

References

External links
 

South Coast (New South Wales)
Public high schools in New South Wales
Educational institutions established in 1993
1993 establishments in Australia